Turini (Aymara turi tower, -ni a suffix to indicate ownership, "the one with a tower", also spelled Torrini) is a mountain in the Bolivian Andes which reaches a height of approximately . It is located in the Potosí Department, Tomás Frías Province, Potosí Municipality, northeast of the city of Potosí. It lies south of Lik'ichiri.

References 

Mountains of Potosí Department